Gaungphat Taung or Mount Khonphan is a mountain in Myanmar. It is located in the Kayin State, in the southern part of the country, 500 km south of the capital Nay Pyi Taw. The top of Gaungphat Taung is 92 meters above sea level.

The terrain around Gaungphat Taung is mainly flat, but south is the hilly. The highest point nearby is 746 meters above sea level, 13.0 km south of Gaungphat Taung. Around Gaungphat Taung, it is sparsely populated, with 9 inhabitants per square kilometer. The surroundings around Gaungphat Taung are a mosaic of farmland and natural vegetation.

Tropical monsoon climate prevails in the area. The average annual temperature in the neighborhood is 25 °C. The warmest month is March, when the average temperature is 29 °C, and the coldest is June, at 19 °C. Average yearly average is 3 257 millimeters. The rainy month is August, with an average of 687 mm rainfall, and the driest is December, with 7 mm rainfall.

See also
List of mountains in Burma

References

External links
"Viewfinder Panoramas Digital elevation Model" (2015-6-21).
"Gaungphat Taung" said "Geonames.org (cc-by)" Geonames.org]; mail updated 2016-06-01; database download downloaded 2016-10-22
"NASA Earth Observations: Population Density NASA/SEDAO
"NASA Earth Observations: Land Cover Classification" NASA/MODES
Peel, M C; Finlayson, B L."Updated world map of the Köppen-Geiger climate classification " Hydrology and Earth System Sciences 11: p. 1633–1644.
"NASA Earth Observations Data set Index NASA
"NASA Earth Observations: Rainfall (1 month-TRMM) NASA/Tropical Rainfall Monitoring Mission

Kayin State
Gaungphat